Richard Weiszmann (born April 8, 1972) is a retired Czechoslovakian-American soccer defender who played for the New England Revolution in 1996.  He also spent five seasons in the USISL.  He is currently the Director of Boys Coaching with the Diablo Futbol Club (DFC) and is a research scientist at Lawrence Livermore Laboratory.

Weiszmann attended the University of California, Berkeley where he played on the men’s soccer team from 1991 to 1994.  He was an All Far West player in 1993 and 1994.  During the 1994 collegiate off season, Weiszmann played for the Santa Cruz Surf of the USISL.  In 1995, he played for the North Bay Breakers.  In February 1996, the New England Revolution selected Weiszmann in the 10th round of 1996 MLS Inaugural Player Draft. He played ten games for the Revs before being waived on June 30, 1996.  He returned to Northern California and signed with the San Jose Clash, but never had a first team game.  In 1997, he joined the Chico Rooks of the USISL, playing with the team through the 1999 season.
Weiszmann has coached for several years with Diablo Futbol Club (DFC).  He is currently the club’s Director of Boys Coaching.   He also works at Lawrence Livermore Laboratory.

References

External links
 

1972 births
Living people
American soccer coaches
American soccer players
California Golden Bears men's soccer players
Chico Rooks players
Major League Soccer players
New England Revolution players
North Bay Breakers players
Santa Cruz Surf players
University of California, Berkeley alumni
USISL players
American scientists
Association football defenders